Željko Ačkar (born 21 February 1969) is a retired Croatian football midfielder.

References

1969 births
Living people
Association football midfielders
Croatian footballers
HNK Cibalia players
HNK Gorica players
NK Dubrava players
NK Zadar players
NK Neretva players
HNK Šibenik players
NK Marsonia players
NK Međimurje players
Croatian Football League players